A Kind of Magic is a 1986 album by English rock band Queen.

A Kind of Magic may also refer to:

 A Kind of Magic (song), a 1986 song by Queen, and the title track from the album of the same name
 A Kind of Magic (TV series), a French animated television series
 A Kind of Magic (film), one of the titles used for a proposed film on the life of Freddie Mercury